The 2023 Sacred Heart Pioneers men's volleyball team represents Sacred Heart University in the 2023 NCAA Division I & II men's volleyball season. The Pioneers, led by first year head coach Adam Niemczynowicz, play their home games at William H. Pitt Center. The Pioneers compete as a member of the newly created Northeast Conference men's volleyball conference. The Pioneers were picked to finish fifth in the NEC pre-season poll.

Season highlights
Will be filled in as the season progresses.

Roster

Schedule
TV/Internet Streaming information:
All home games will be streamed on NEC Front Row. Most road games will be streamed by the schools streaming service.

 *-Indicates conference match.
 Times listed are Eastern Time Zone.

Announcers for televised games
Harvard: Bernie Picozzi
NJIT: Ira Thor 
Stevens: Evan Cormier & Robert Finizio
Purdue Fort Wayne: 
Ball State: 
Princeton: 
American International: 
D'Youville: 
Daemen: 
St. Francis: 
Fairleigh Dickinson: 
Merrimack: 
Merrimack: 
Harvard: 
St. Francis Brooklyn: 
LIU: 
St. Francis: 
Farleigh Dickinson: 
American International: 
Daemen: 
D'Youville: 
St. Francis Brooklyn: 
LIU:

References

2023 in sports in Connecticut
Sacred Heart
Sacred Heart